Robert Kondakhsazov, July 26, 1937 – June 23, 2010 was Georgian-born artist, writer and philosopher, Honored Artist of Georgia.

Biography 

Robert Kondakhsazov was born on July 23, 1937, in Tbilisi, Georgia.

After graduating from the Tbilisi Academy of Art in 1963 worked in the areas of design, book illustrating and scenography, was the lead artist of the Tbilisi state Puppetry theatre.

Kondakhsazov started exposing his art in 1964, first personal exhibition took place in 1989.

Starting October 2005 Kondakhsazov resided in Moscow, Russia where he deceased in 2010.

Art and Exhibitions 

Robert Kondakhsazov is an author of over 1,000 paintings. They are stored in Tbilisi National Museum of Arts as well as in private collections in Russia, Armenia, Georgia, Great Britain, USA, France, Belgium, the Netherlands, Israel, Australia and other countries.

List of exhibitions includes:

 1964, 1965, 1967, 1969, 1972, 1975 – annual poster exhibition in the State picture gallery of Georgia
 1965 – participation in the decorative and applied arts exposition in All-Russia Exhibition Centre, Moscow, USSR
 1973 – honored diploma of the Ministry of Culture of USSR and All-Russia theatrical society for performance design in Tbilisi State Puppetry
 1988 – Retrospective exhibition of Georgian Art, Central House of Artists, Moscow, USSR
 1989 – First personal exhibition in the House of Artist, Tbilisi, USSR
 2000 – Exhibition "Yesterday-Today", "Vernisage" gallery, Tbilisi, Georgia
 2002 – Art Exhibition, "TBC" Bank, Tbilisi, Georgia
 2003 – "Kaleidoscope" Art Exhibition, Tbilisi, Georgia
 2003 – "Sixtiers - Artists" exposition, National Art Gallery of Georgia
 2003 – Personal exposition, "Sololaki" gallery, Tbilisi, Georgia
 2006 – Personal exposition, "The Other Art" gallery of the Russian State University for the Humanities museum center (branch of the Pushkin Museum of Fine Arts)
 2006 – "Dialogue of Cultures. Armenia – Russia" exposition, Moscow House of Nationalities
 2008 – "New Eclecticism" exhibition, exhibition hall of Moscow Artists Union, Moscow, Russia
 2008 – Personal Exhibition, "IBM" company, Moscow, Russia
 2008 – Personal Exhibition, Roslin Art Gallery of Armenian Art, Moscow, Russia
 2009 – "Art-Most" exhibition, Yerevan, Armenia
 2010 – Memorial Personal Exhibition, Caucasus House, Tbilisi, Georgia

Literature experience 

Robert Kondakhsazov is an author of memoirs "Unfinished notebooks", part of which was published in Friendship of Nations, Russia, Magazine in 2011. Apart from paintings, Robert Kondakhsazov wrote memoirs, poems and philosophical notes.

Links 
 Article about Robert Kondakhsazov by Vladimir Sarishvili
 "Unfinished Notebooks" memoirs, Robert Kondakhsazov, "Friendship of Nations" magazine (2011, №9)
 "Unfinished Notebooks" memoirs, Robert Kondakhsazov, "The Russian Club"
 Выставка памяти Роберта Кондахсазова в Тбилиси
 "Kondakhsazov's worlds", article, Artem Grigorenz
 Memorial Exhibition of Robert Kondakhsazov

1937 births
2010 deaths
Georgian people of Armenian descent
Artists from Tbilisi